World's End is located within the Horton Plains National Park in Nuwara Eliya District, Sri Lanka. It is one of the most visited parts of the Park, and a key tourist attraction in the Nuwara Eliya District and the country at large.

1 km away from the main cliff is a smaller cliff with a  drop, colloquially known as Mini World's End. The Indian Ocean, 81 km to the south, can be observed on clear days.

References

External links 

 Journey to the end of the world

Landforms of Nuwara Eliya District
Tourist attractions in Central Province, Sri Lanka